Đặng Văn Lâm (born 13 August 1993) is a Vietnamese professional footballer who plays as a goalkeeper for V.League 1 club Topenland Bình Định and the Vietnam national team.

Club career
Văn Lâm began his career with Hoàng Anh Gia Lai, but after early promise he was loaned out to the sister team in Laos and his progress stalled. Văn Lâm then returned to his birthplace to join teams in the lower divisions of Russian football, and in 2015 he rejoined Vietnam Hải Phòng. After failing to get a game his first season he became a starter for the 2016 season and earned a surprise call up shortly after for the national team by coach Toshiya Miura.

Văn Lâm's greatest strength is his height and his arm span is nearly two meters(1.93), but he is hampered by slow reflexes and hesitancy to rush off his line. His u-19 coach Triệu Quang Hà said that Văn Lâm has potential but he has to improve his game if he wishes to play regularly.

In September 2017, after an incident with Lê Sỹ Mạnh, one of the club's staffs, and other defenders in Hải Phòng, Văn Lâm left and returned to Russia. The contract lasted for a year before he returned to the club.

On 7 June 2019, Thai League 1 club Muangthong United announced that Van Lam had signed a three-year contract.

In January 2021, after a contract dispute with Muangthong United, FIFA temporarily granted Van Lam a transfer license, thus paving the way for Van Lam to sign a contract with Cerezo Osaka. He is officially the first Vietnamese in the J1 League, the first division of Japanese Football, with other Vietnamese players in the past only playing in the 2nd division before.

On June 9, 2021, Van Lam made his debut for Cerezo in an Emperor's Cup match against Gainare Tottori, keeping a clean sheet in a 2–0 win. On July 6, 2021, he made his AFC Champions League Debut against Guangzhou FC.

In August 2022, yet without any league appearance, Van Lam left Cerezo for V.League 1 club Topenland Bình Định.

International career
He began to play for Vietnam's national team in 2015 as Vietnam was seeking players of Vietnamese descent abroad. Together with Czech-born Mạc Hồng Quân, he is one of two prominent overseas Vietnamese players selected to the national team.

In June 2017, he made his debut on the 2019 AFC Asian Cup qualification against Jordan at Ho Chi Minh City, where his ability helped to keep a clean sheet as the match ended 0–0. He was praised for his skills. However, it was not until the 2018 AFF Championship that his potential had earned him reputation, helping Vietnam to conquer Southeast Asia after ten years from their maiden title.

During the round of 16 of the 2019 AFC Asian Cup, once again facing against Jordan, he made a crucial save against Ahmed Samir on the penalty shootout after 120 minutes of game time to help Vietnam qualify for the quarter-finals.

He became instrumental in Vietnam's current 2022 FIFA World Cup qualification 2nd round where he produced a strong performance, including a phenomenon foot-like penalty save in Vietnam's crucial game against rival Thailand at home which has been compared to Igor Akinfeev's penalty save against Spain in 2018 FIFA World Cup due to similar save. In the second half of the second round qualification, Dang Van Lam had to withdraw from the roster after one of his teammate in Cerezo Osaka contracted COVID-19.

Personal life 

Đặng Văn Lâm was born in Moscow to a Vietnamese father Đặng Văn Sơn and a Russian mother Olga Zhukova. Both of his parents were involved in performing arts, with his mother being a former ballet dancer. He also has two siblings, a younger brother and a younger sister. His Russian name, Lev, is contributed to his mother's passionate admiration to the legend Soviet goalkeeper Lev Yashin, whom himself also admired.

Although greatly influenced by family's artistic involvement, he chose to follow football instead. He is known for his good singing voice. He can speak three languages, Vietnamese, Russian and English.

He is an Orthodox Christian, often prayed in the cross as a sign of his belief, making him the first Vietnamese Orthodox Christian footballer in the national team.

As a half-Russian, he is also a fan of Russia national football team. He typically salutes the national team in the style of Artem Dzyuba, who is also an idol for Đặng Văn Lâm himself.

Career statistics

International

Honours 
Hoang Anh Attapeu
Lao League runner-up: 2013
Hải Phòng
V.League 1 runner-up: 2016
Bình Định
V.League 1 third place: 2022
Vietnamese National Cup runner-up: 2022
Cerezo Osaka
J.League Cup runner-up: 2021
Vietnam U23/Olympic
VFF Cup: 2018
Vietnam 
AFF Championship: 2018; runner-up: 2022
VFF Cup: 2022
King's Cup runner-up 2019

Individual
AFF Championship Best eleven: 2018
 ASEAN Football Federation Best XI: 2019
AFF Championship Best XI: 2022

See also
 List of Vietnam footballers born outside Vietnam

References

External links

1993 births
2019 AFC Asian Cup players
Association football goalkeepers
Expatriate footballers in Laos
Eastern Orthodox Christians from Vietnam
Footballers from Moscow
Haiphong FC players
Hoang Anh Gia Lai FC players
Living people
Đặng Văn Lâm
Russian footballers
Russian people of Vietnamese descent
Sportspeople of Vietnamese descent
Vietnam international footballers
Vietnamese expatriate sportspeople in Laos
Vietnamese footballers
V.League 1 players